The "Three Wise Men Parade" is a traditional parade with floats carrying the wise men taking place in practically all Spanish cities and villages (known in Spanish as Cabalgata de Reyes Magos, in Galician as A Cabalgata dos Reis Magos and in Basque as Errege magoen desfilea, in Catalan Cavalcada de Reis, in Esperanto as Kavalkado de la Tri Reĝoj), in Andorra and Argentina, in some cities and towns in Mexico and Gibraltar. The Magi (of which tradition holds there were three: Melchior, Gaspar, and Balthazar) ride through the streets, as their pages (both boys and girls) collect children's letters to the kings and also throw candy to children. The cavalcade usually includes dancers, musicians, and pages, as well as other assistants to the kings.

The first Cavalcade in Spain is documented from 1855 in Barcelona, and the longest-standing cavalcade is in Alcoi, in the Valencian Country, where it has been celebrated uninterruptedly since 1866. 

It is celebrated every January 5 (the day preceding the feast of Epiphany) in the evening. In Spain, after greeting the kings at the cavalcade in town, children are supposed to go home and go to bed early. They clean and put out their shoes, and the following morning, find the gifts of the Magi, which they requested in a letter, in and around their shoes. Paper cut-outs are usually also put out to adorn the scene, and the children usually put out cookies and some brandy or other drink for the kings to sit and enjoy themselves for a moment before moving on to the next house, and a bucket of water for their camels. According to this tradition, the children who have behaved badly during the previous year receive coal rather than candy, though (as in the case of Santa Claus) this is not a frequent occurrence. They might get coal candy, though.

The great cavalcade of Madrid is broadcast live on TVE 1 (the central public Spanish channel) every year, whereas regional television channels broadcast their own parades. The cavalcade of Alcoi is the oldest in the world and is a major draw of international tourism for Spain. Small towns and villages celebrate cavalcades with traditional props, some of which involve Romans, shepherds and camels, while other places have modernized to tractors and fancy cars, though most of the parade goes by on foot and in a few floats. 

In Poland the first Cavalcade took place in 2008 in Warsaw. In 2016, the parade took place in over 450 Polish cities.

References

See also
List of Christmas and holiday season parades
Liturgical drama
Medieval theatre
Mystery play
Star boys' singing procession
Santa Claus parade

Medieval drama
Drama
Christmas and holiday season parades
Christmastide
Christmas in Spain
Epiphany (holiday)